Mitromorpha diaoyuensis is a species of sea snail, a marine gastropod mollusk in the family Mitromorphidae.

Description
The length of the shell attains 8 mm.

Distribution
This species occurs off the Diaoyu (Senkalu) Islands, East China Sea.

References

 Mifsud C. (2013) Mitromorpha (Mitrolumna) diaoyuensis n. sp. (Prosobranchia: Conidae), a new species from Diaoyu (Senkalu) Islands, East China Sea. Journal of Conchology 41(4): 461–463

External links
 

diaoyuensis
Gastropods described in 2013